Pristimantis pleurostriatus is a species of frog in the family Strabomantidae.
It is endemic to Venezuela.
Its natural habitat is tropical moist montane forests.

References

 La Marca, E. 2004.  Eleutherodactylus pleurostriatus.   2006 IUCN Red List of Threatened Species.   Downloaded on 22 July 2007.

pleurostriatus
Endemic fauna of Venezuela
Amphibians of Venezuela
Amphibians described in 1982
Taxonomy articles created by Polbot